Jo Jin-seop (also known as Cho Jin-Sup, born 5 January 1965) is a South Korean windsurfer. He competed in the Windglider event at the 1984 Summer Olympics.

References

External links
 
 

1965 births
Living people
South Korean windsurfers
South Korean male sailors (sport)
Olympic sailors of South Korea
Sailors at the 1984 Summer Olympics – Windglider
Place of birth missing (living people)